
Padre means father in many Romance languages, and it may also refer to:

Music
 "Padre" (song)

People
 A military chaplain
 A Latin Catholic priest
 A member of the San Diego Padres baseball team

Places
 Padre Island, a barrier island in the U.S. State of Texas
 North Padre Island, northern part of the Padre Island
 South Padre Island, southern part of the Padre Island 
 Padre Island National Seashore

Software
 Padre (software), an integrated development environment for the Perl programming language

Others
 PADRE, Partnership for Acid Drainage Remediation in Europe
 The Padre, a 2018 film

See also
Padres (disambiguation)